Canada–El Salvador relations are the diplomatic relations between the Canada and the Republic of El Salvador.  Both nations are members of the Organization of American States and the United Nations.

History
Diplomatic relations between Canada and El Salvador were established on 29 December 1961. El Salvador opened its embassy in Ottawa in 1973. Initially, Canada accredited an ambassador to El Salvador based in Costa Rica and then from Guatemala. In 1995, Canada opened a diplomatic office in San Salvador before establishing a resident embassy in 2005.

During the Salvadoran Civil War, Canada accepted thousands of Salvadoran refugees fleeing the war. In 1981, Canada cut aid to El Salvador because of concerns about death squads in the country. Aid was renewed in 1985. After the signing of the Chapultepec Peace Accords in January 1992, Canada pledged up to $5 million for poverty alleviation, human rights promotion and democratization in El Salvador.

In January 2001, an earthquake struck El Salvador killing over 900 people. Canada immediately sent the 436 Transport Squadron with aid supplies to El Salvador. Between 2001 and 2010, Canada and El Salvador (along with Guatemala, Honduras and Nicaragua) negotiated the Canada–Central American Four Free Trade Agreement, however, after twelve rounds of negotiations, no agreement had been reached and the free trade agreement remains defunct.

In October 2018, both nations signed an agreement for direct air transportation.
 In 2018, both nations celebrated 57 years of diplomatic relations.

High-level visits
High-level visits from Canada to El Salvador
 Foreign Vice Minister Jon Allen (2011)
 Foreign Minister of State Diane Ablonczy (2011)
 Foreign Vice Minister Michael Grant (2018)

High-level visits from El Salvador to Canada
 President Francisco Flores Pérez (2001)

Transportation
There are direct flights between both nations with Air Transat and Avianca Costa Rica.

Trade
In 2017, trade between Canada and El Salvador totaled US$164.6 million. Canada's main exports to El Salvador include: paper and paperboard, plastics, fats and oils, and machinery. El Salvador's main exports to Canada include: sugar, clothing and coffee. In 2016, Canadian direct investment in El Salvador was US$965 million. Canadian multinational company, Scotiabank operates in El Salvador.

Resident diplomatic missions

 Canada has an embassy in San Salvador.
 El Salvador has an embassy in Ottawa and consulates-general in Calgary, Montreal, Toronto and Vancouver.

See also
 Foreign relations of Canada
 Foreign relations of El Salvador
 Salvadoran Canadians

References 

 
El Salvador
Canada